Phyllobrostis hartmanni is a moth in the  family Lyonetiidae. It is found in Switzerland, France, Germany, Austria, Italy and Slovakia. It is listed as endangered on the Red List of Bavaria.

The wingspan is 6.5–7.2 mm for males and 7–8 mm for females.

The larvae feed on Daphne alpina, Daphne cneorum and Daphne striata. They mine the leaves of their host plant. The mine starts as a fine corridor, often following the leaf margin. Later, a large, somewhat inflated, full depth blotch is made, extending from the leaf tip. In the end this blotch may occupy the entire leaf. The mine is filled with black frass that is glued to the upper epidermis, only leaving the sides free and transparent. Pupation takes place outside of the mine.

External links
Revision of the genus Phyllobrostis Staudinger, 1859 (Lepidoptera, Lyonetiidae)
bladmineerders.nl

Lyonetiidae
Moths of Europe
Moths described in 1867